Charles Ewing may refer to:

 Charles Ewing (general) (1835–1893), attorney and Union Army general during the American Civil War
 Charles Ewing (politician) (1780–1832), American politician and judge from New Jersey
 Charles H. Ewing (c. 1866–1935), president of the Reading Company, 1932–1935
 Charles Patrick Ewing, forensic psychologist, attorney and professor at the University at Buffalo Law School